Kasturi Gopalan (8 November 1890 – 9 December 1974) was an Indian publisher who founded the publishing company Kasturi & Sons which publishes The Hindu.

Early life 

Gopalan was born in Coimbatore on 8 November 1890 to S. Kasturi Ranga Iyengar, a lawyer from Kumbakonam. Kasturi Ranga Iyengar belonged to an illustrious Vaishnavite Brahmin family of the Tanjore district. He was Kasturi Ranga Iyengar's younger son, the elder being K. Srinivasan.

Career 

While Srinivasan, A. Rangaswami Iyengar and S. Rangaswami Iyengar were involved in editing The Hindu, Gopalan founded and managed Kasturi & Sons—which published the newspaper in addition to journals like Sport and Pastime, Frontline, and Indian Cricket, an annual cricket yearbook.

Death 

Gopalan died in December 1974 at the age of 84 after having served as publisher for more than five decades.

Personal life 

Gopalan married Ranganayaki and had two sons both of whom served in the board of The Hindu

 G. Narasimhan (1916-1977)
 G. Kasturi (1924-2012)

1890 births
1974 deaths
People from Coimbatore